The Woodward-Granger Community School District is a rural public school district headquartered in Granger, Iowa.

The district spans northeastern Dallas County, with smaller areas in Boone and Polk counties. The district serves Woodward, Granger, and the surrounding rural areas.  The district was founded in 1963 as the consolidation of Woodward and Granger schools.

Schools 
The district operates five schools:
Woodward-Granger Early Learning Center, Granger
Woodward-Granger Elementary School, Granger
Woodward-Granger Middle School, Woodward
Woodward-Granger High School, Woodward
Grandwood School, Granger

Woodward-Granger High School 
The school mascot in the Hawks, and the colors are green and gold.

Athletics 
The Hawks compete in the West Central Activities Conference in the following sports:
Cross Country
Volleyball
Football
Basketball
Wrestling
Track and Field
 Boys' 1970 Class C State Champions
Golf
 Boys' 2-time State Champions (1987, 1990)
Baseball
Softball
 1998 Class 1A State Champions

Woodward-Granger students can also compete with Johnston in the following sports:
Soccer
Tennis

Enrollment

See also 
List of school districts in Iowa
List of high schools in Iowa

References

External links 
 Woodward-Granger Community School District
 Woodward Academy

School districts in Iowa
Education in Boone County, Iowa
Education in Dallas County, Iowa
Education in Polk County, Iowa
School districts established in 1995
1995 establishments in Iowa